Nick Miller (born 24 October 1991) is a New Zealand racing cyclist, who last rode for Futuro–Maxxis Pro Cycling.

Major results

2016
 9th The REV Classic
2017
 6th Overall Jelajah Malaysia
 7th Overall Tour de Flores

References

1991 births
Living people
New Zealand male cyclists
21st-century New Zealand people